The 2017 Southern Conference football season was the 96th season of college football for the Southern Conference (SoCon) and formed a part of the 2017 NCAA Division I FCS football season.

Head coaches

Tom Arth, Chattanooga – 1st year
Brent Thompson, The Citadel – 2nd year
Carl Torbush, East Tennessee State – 3rd year
Clay Hendrix, Furman – 1st year
Bobby Lamb, Mercer – 5th year

Chris Hatcher, Samford – 3rd year
Scott Wachenheim, VMI – 3rd year
Mark Speir, Western Carolina – 6th year
Mike Ayers, Wofford – 30th year

Preseason poll results
First place votes in parentheses

Preseason All-Conference Teams
Offensive Player of the Year: Devlin Hodges, R-Jr., QB, Samford
Defensive Player of the Year: Kailik Williams, Sr., DB, The Citadel

Rankings

Regular season

All times Eastern time.

Rankings reflect that of the Sports Network poll for that week.

Week One

Players of the week:

Week Two

Players of the week:

Week Three

Players of the week:

Week Four

Players of the week:

Week Five

Players of the week:

Week Six

Players of the week:

Week Seven

Players of the week:

Week Eight

Players of the week:

Week Nine

Players of the week:

Week Ten

Players of the week:

Week Eleven

Players of the week:

Week Twelve

Players of the week:

Week Thirteen

Records against other conferences

FCS conferences

FBS conferences

Attendance

Notes

References